Cliochloria senegalensis is a species of ulidiid or picture-winged fly in the genus Cliochloria of the family Tephritidae.

References

Ulidiidae